Thomas Amrhein (born 30 May 1989) is a Swiss bobsledder. He competed in the 2018 Winter Olympics.

References

1989 births
Living people
Bobsledders at the 2018 Winter Olympics
Swiss male bobsledders
Olympic bobsledders of Switzerland
21st-century Swiss people